

List of New York State Assembly Members 2005–06

 2005
New York State Assembly
Lists of New York (state) politicians